Echinops setifer is a perennial globe thistle species of flowering plant in the genus Echinops, native to central and southern Japan, Korea and eastern China.

References 

setifer
Flora of Japan
Flora of Korea